The European School, Bergen (in Dutch: Europese School Bergen, in French: École Européenne de Bergen, in German: Europäische Schule Bergen) (or ESB) is one of the thirteen European Schools. It is located in the town of Bergen in the Dutch province of North Holland.  The school prioritises, for enrolment purposes, the children of European Union staff. Students must enrol in either the English, French or Dutch language sections of the school.

History

The European School, Bergen was established in 1963 primarily to provide an education to the children of staff employed by the European Atomic Energy Community's (Euratom) nuclear research facility in nearby Petten - today under the remit of the European Commission's Joint Research Centre.

EMA relocation
In 2019, enrolment in the school increased by 20% as a result of the relocation of the European Medicines Agency (EMA), its staff and their families to Amsterdam, as part of arrangements for the UK's withdrawal from the European Union. This increased the daily number of students commuting from Amsterdam to the school to 20% of total enrolment. As a result, the Dutch education ministry announced in late 2019 that it was investigating relocating the school to a new campus in 4 or 5 years time, with the municipalities of Alkmaar, Castricum and Zaanstad expressing interest in hosting the school. Eventually Zaanstad and Alkmaar filed motions to apply for this right.  On July 9th, 2021, the decision was made to move the school to Alkmaar.

See also 
European School
European Schools

References 

Bergen, North Holland
International schools in the Netherlands
Bergen
Educational institutions established in 1963
1963 establishments in the Netherlands